Cadden is a surname. Notable people with the surname include:

 Chris Cadden (born 1996), Scottish footballer
 Cory Cadden (1969–2017), Canadian ice hockey player
 Joan Cadden (born 1941), American beautician and politician
 Joan Cadden (historian) (born 1944), American historian
 Joe Cadden (1920–1981), Scottish footballer
 Mamie Cadden (1891–1959), Irish midwife, backstreet abortionist, and convicted murderer
 Nicky Cadden (born 1996), Scottish footballer
 Suzanne Cadden (born 1957), Scottish amateur golfer
 Thomas Scott Cadden  (1923–2007), television commercial producer, director, writer, and songwriter